Slocum is a small village in the town of North Kingstown, Rhode Island. Located near North Kingstown's border with Exeter, Rhode Island, Slocum is largely open fields and farms.
Slocum's zip code is 02877.

References

Villages in Washington County, Rhode Island
Villages in Rhode Island